Brichermillen is a former mill and small hamlet located in the commune of Contern. It is located on the Syre, at an altitude of 264 meters on the border of the communes of Contern, Weiler-la-Tour and Dalheim. Brichermillen is on a small spur of a road which branches off of the CR132 road between Syren and Moutfort, the road keeps going and becomes a small trail until it reaches Syren. A few hundred meters northeast of the mill lies the Bricherhaff. Both buildings are owned by the same owner. Bricherhaff is on a separate road spur and is also atop the Syre. Brichermillen is located around 2 kilometres straight south of Contern.

History 
The mill was first mentioned in writing in 1689, but it is believed that there was already a mill there a long time ago. The mill changed owners several times and was thus rebuilt and enlarged. It has belonged to the Hemmen family since the end of the 19th century.

Until 1913, energy was gained by hydropower, then worked by electricity. During an explosion, the building was severely damaged in 1944 and was subsequently rebuilt in its current form. The mill business was discontinued in 1975, and since then housing has been established there and has been expanded slightly since.

The name Bricher comes from the German word Bruch or Bruchwald, which is a supple forest.

Geography 
Around Brichemillen the Syre Splits in twain and there's also a small pond just southwest of it. Some small trails run directly east of Brichermillen roughly following the border of Contern and Dalheim. These trails lead up towards Medingen and the hill named Zennebierg. To get to these places the trails run thorugh the Bricherbesch and the Meidengergrendchen. Opposite the CR132 there's a small freight railway. A small number of walking and hiking trails run through Brichermillen.

References 

Contern